Louis d'Évreux, Count of Étampes (1336 – 6 May 1400) was the son of Charles d'Évreux and Maria de La Cerda y Lara.

According to Froissart he was captured at Poitiers and ransomed. He later served as one of the royal hostages given to Edward III of England to guarantee the Treaty of Brétigny. In the 1390s, Louis was included in the entourage of John, Duke of Berry, who ultimately succeeded him in Étampes.

He married Jeanne (d. 1389), daughter of Raoul I of Brienne, Count of Eu and widow of Walter VI of Brienne, but they had no children.

References

Sources

Evreux, Louis II of
Evreux, Louis II of
Louis
D'Evreux, Louis II
D'Evreux, Louis II
14th-century peers of France
French prisoners of war in the Hundred Years' War